is a railway station located in Nagayama-chō 14-chōme, Asahikawa, Hokkaidō, and is operated by the Hokkaido Railway Company.

Lines Serviced
Hokkaido Railway Company
Sōya Main Line

Adjacent stations

External links
Ekikara Time Table - JR Kita-Nagayama Station (Japanese)

Railway stations in Hokkaido Prefecture
Railway stations in Japan opened in 1959
Buildings and structures in Asahikawa